The Big Ten Conference Men's Basketball Freshman of the Year is a basketball award given to the Big Ten Conference's most outstanding freshman player. The award was first given following the 1985–86 season.

Indiana has the record for the most winners with eleven.

Key

Winners

Winners by school

Footnotes
During the 1986-1987 season Garrett was not a freshman but was a junior college transfer.
Webber's selection was later vacated as a result of sanctions due to NCAA violations.

References

Player of the Year
NCAA Division I men's basketball conference rookies of the year
Awards established in 1985
1985 establishments in the United States